Jürgen Peter Vogel (born 29 April 1968, in Hamburg) is a German actor, screenwriter, film producer and singer. One of the most successful character actors in German cinema, he first broke out in 1992 with his role in Little Sharks.

Biography
Jürgen Vogel is the son of a Hamburg waiter and a housewife. He worked as a child model, later had various jobs and visited the Munich drama school for one day. In 1985 he moved to Berlin, where he shared a flat with German actor Richy Müller. He states that he was inspired by the movie Taxi Driver, starring Robert De Niro. He became famous with the movie Little Sharks (German: Kleine Haie) in 1992. He won the Silver Bear award in 2006 for his work as an actor, co-author, and co-producer for the film The Free Will (German: Der freie Wille). Vogel had his first child, a daughter, Maria Vogel (born 1988), from a previous relationship. He married Madeleine Sommerfeld in 1997, adopted her two sons and the couple had a daughter (born 1999). After their divorce, he had another son (born 2009) with assistant director Michelle Gornick. Vogel had his 6th child, a daughter, (born 2019) with his fiancée, actress Natalia Belitski.

Awards 
1989: Bayerischer Filmpreis – best young actor in Rosamunde
1992: Bayerischer Filmpreis – best actor in Kleine Haie (Little Sharks)
1994: Telestar for Dann eben mit Gewalt (Violence: The Last Resort)
1997: Deutscher Filmpreis – best male lead in Das Leben ist eine Baustelle (Life is All You Get)
1998: Deutscher Shooting Star
2000: Jupiter – best TV Star
2001: Adolf-Grimme-Preis for Das Phantom (The Phantom)
2003: Goldene Kamera – best German actor in Nackt und Scherbentanz (Shattered Glass)
2006: 42nd Chicago International Film Festival – Silver Hugo Award – best actor in Der freie Wille (The Free Will)
2006: Tribeca Film Festival, New York – best male lead in Der freie Wille (The Free Will)
2006: Silberner (silver) Bär in the category of special artistic performance in Der freie Wille (The Free Will)
2007: Bayerischer Filmpreis  – best male lead in Emmas Glück (Emma's Bliss)
2007: Ernst-Lubitsch-Preis for his roles in Ein Freund von mir (A Friend of Mine) and Wo ist Fred? (Where is Fred?)
2009: Jupiter – best actor in Die Welle (The Wave)
2010: Herbert-Strate-Preis

Selected filmography

Films

Television series

References

External links

 
 Photographs and bibliography

1968 births
Living people
Male actors from Hamburg
German male film actors
German male television actors
20th-century German male actors
21st-century German male actors
German Film Award winners
Musicians from Hamburg